Micropterix anglica is an extinct species of moth belonging to the family Micropterigidae which was described by Edmund A Jarzembowski in 1980.

Fossil remains, dated to the Oligocene, have been found on the Isle of Wight. The veins are mostly dark brown with intervening membrane light brown.

References

†
Fossil Lepidoptera
Fossil taxa described in 1980
Environment of the Isle of Wight
Oligocene insects
Prehistoric insects of Europe